Marina Vladimirovna Klimova (born 28 June 1966) is a former competitive ice dancer who competed for the Soviet Union and the Unified Team. With skating partner and husband Sergei Ponomarenko, she is the 1992 Olympic champion, the 1988 Olympic silver medalist, the 1984 Olympic bronze medalist, a three-time World champion, and a four-time European champion.

Career 
Klimova trained at Spartak in Moscow. Early in her career, she skated with Oleg Gennadyevich Volkov.

Klimova and Ponomarenko were fourth in their European Championships debut in 1983. Their breakthrough came the following season when they won the bronze medal at the 1984 Winter Olympics and 1984 European Championships. In 1985, they won their first World medal, silver. They were four-time consecutive World silver medalists from 1985 to 1988. In 1988, they also won the Olympic silver medal, behind Natalia Bestemianova and Andrei Bukin.

In 1989, Klimova and Ponomarenko won the first of their four consecutive European titles. They also won the 1989 World Championships and followed that up with another World gold the following year.

At the 1991 World Championships, they had a setback when they placed second to Isabelle Duchesnay & Paul Duchesnay. Four months before the Olympics, they decided to leave coach Natalia Dubova. They re-established themselves as the top ice dancers in the world by winning another 1992 European title and then capturing the 1992 Olympic title. They ended their season with their third World title. They retired from eligible skating after the World Championships and turned to professional and show skating.

In addition to winning three World Championships and four European Championships, Klimova and Ponomarenko are the first figure skaters in any discipline to have won Olympic medals in three different colors. They won the bronze medal at the 1984 Winter Olympics, the silver medal at the 1988 Winter Olympics for the Soviet Union and the gold medal at the 1992 Winter Olympics for the Unified Team.

Klimova and Ponomarenko were inducted into the World Figure Skating Hall of Fame in 2000. They coach young figure skaters at Sharks Ice in San Jose, California.

Personal life 
Klimova and Ponomarenko married in September 1984. They now reside in the United States in Morgan Hill, California. They have two sons, Tim Ponomarenko, born in 1998, and Anthony Ponomarenko, born on January 5, 2001, in San Jose, California. Anthony is a competitive ice dancer for the United States.

Programs 
(With Ponomarenko)

Results

With Sergei Ponomarenko 

Professional career

With Oleg Volkov

References

External links

Navigation

1966 births
Living people
Russian female ice dancers
Soviet female ice dancers
Olympic figure skaters of the Soviet Union
Olympic figure skaters of the Unified Team
Figure skaters at the 1984 Winter Olympics
Figure skaters at the 1988 Winter Olympics
Figure skaters at the 1992 Winter Olympics
Olympic gold medalists for the Unified Team
Olympic silver medalists for the Soviet Union
Olympic bronze medalists for the Soviet Union
Sportspeople from Yekaterinburg
Spartak athletes
Figure skaters from San Jose, California
Olympic medalists in figure skating
World Figure Skating Championships medalists
European Figure Skating Championships medalists
People from Morgan Hill, California
Medalists at the 1984 Winter Olympics
Medalists at the 1988 Winter Olympics
Medalists at the 1992 Winter Olympics
American female ice dancers
Goodwill Games medalists in figure skating
Competitors at the 1990 Goodwill Games
21st-century American women